Henri Adolphe Auguste Deglane (10 December 1855, Paris - 13 May 1931, Marquay) was a French architect.

Biography 
He was a student of Louis-Jules André at the École des Beaux-Arts in Paris. His first exhibit was in 1880, at the Salon des Artistes Français, where he was awarded a third-class medal. The following year, his designs for a "fine arts palace" earned him the Prix de Rome. He was a resident at the Académie de France à Rome from 1882 to 1885.

Upon returning to France he continued to exhibit at the Salon, obtaining a second-class medal in 1887, and a  medal of honor in 1888. He achieved a gold medal at the Exposition Universelle in 1889. After 1890, he served as head of the architecture studio at the École.

For the Exposition Universelle of 1900, he participated in the design and construction of the Grand Palais (1896-1900). Over the next two decades, he created numerous homes and shops, as well as monuments to Lazare Carnot, Joseph François Dupleix, William Shakespeare, Joan of Arc, and Guy de Maupassant.

His work on the Grand Palais earned him a place as an officer in the Legion of Honor. In 1918, he was elected a member of the Académie des Beaux-Arts, taking Seat #1 for architecture, which he held until his death.

He was able to purchase the Château de Laussel, a sixteenth-century castle near Marquay, and spent his later years restoring it.

References

External links 

1855 births
1931 deaths
Academic staff of the École des Beaux-Arts
Prix de Rome winners
Recipients of the Legion of Honour
Architects from Paris
Members of the Académie des beaux-arts